Trechaleidae (tre-kah-LEE-ih-dee) is a family of araneomorph spiders first described by Eugène Simon in 1890, and includes about 140 described species in 16 genera. They all live in Central and South America except for Shinobius orientalis, which is endemic to Japan. Other names for the family are longlegged water spiders and fishing spiders.

Genera

, the World Spider Catalog accepts the following genera:

Amapalea Silva & Lise, 2006 – Brazil
Barrisca Chamberlin & Ivie, 1936 – South America, Panama
Caricelea Silva & Lise, 2007 – Peru
Cupiennius Simon, 1891 – Mexico to northwestern South America
Dossenus Simon, 1898 – Trinidad, South America
Dyrines Simon, 1903 – South America, Panama
Enna O. Pickard-Cambridge, 1897 – South America, Central America, Mexico
Heidrunea Brescovit & Höfer, 1994 – Brazil
Hesydrus Simon, 1898 – South America, Central America
Neoctenus Simon, 1897 – Brazil, Guyana, Peru
Paradossenus F. O. Pickard-Cambridge, 1903 – South America, Nicaragua
Paratrechalea Carico, 2005 – Brazil, Argentina, Uruguay
Rhoicinus Simon, 1898 – South America
Shinobius Yaginuma, 1991 – Japan
Syntrechalea F. O. Pickard-Cambridge, 1902 – South America, Mexico
Trechalea Thorell, 1869 – Trinidad, South America, North America, Central America
Trechaleoides Carico, 2005 – South America

See also
 List of Trechaleidae species

References

Further reading 
 Höfer, H. & A. D. Brescovit. On the spider genus Rhoicinus (Araneae, Trechaleidae) in a central Amazonian inundation forest. J. Arachnol. 22: 54-59. PDF
 Carico, J. E. (1993b). Revision of the genus Trechalea Thorell (Araneae, Trechaleidae) with a review of the taxonomy of the Trechaleidae and Pisauridae of the Western Hemisphere. J. Arachnol. 21: 226-257. PDF

 
Araneomorphae families

tr:Trochanteriidae